The 1999 Mnet Video Music Awards was the first of the annual music awards in Seoul, South Korea that took place on November 27, 1999, at Little Angels Arts Center.

Leading the nominees were the boy-band group H.O.T. and solo artist Lee Seung-hwan with three each, followed by four artists including the new boy-band group g.o.d with three. By the end of the ceremony, boy-band group H.O.T., Lee Seung-hwan and Lee Jung-hyun received the most wins with two awards.

Background
The award-giving body began in this year under the name "Mnet Km Music Festival" (MKMF). During this time, it was the first and only Korean music video awards ceremony. It consists of 14 categories including the Best International Artist. The grand awards (or daesang) were Best Popular Music Video and Music Video of the Year.

Winners and nominees
Winners are listed first and highlighted in boldface.

Special award
기획상: 대한민국/전 리안 – 이채형

Multiple awards

Artist(s) with multiple wins
The following artist(s) received two or more wins (excluding the special awards):

Artist(s) with multiple nominations
The following artist(s) received two or more nominations:

Performers and presenters
The following individuals and groups, listed in order of appearance, presented awards or performed musical numbers.

Performers

Presenters

References

External links
 Mnet Asian Music Awards  official website

MAMA Awards ceremonies
Mnet Music Video Festival
Mnet Music Video Festival
Mnet Music Video Festival, 1999
Mnet Music Video Festival